Meniga is a software company founded in Reykjavík, Iceland in 2009 by Georg Ludviksson (CEO) and brothers Asgeir Asgeirsson (CTO) and Viggo Asgeirsson (CHRO).

Meniga provides digital banking solutions, and was one of the first companies to use PFM software in Europe. Meniga was founded in 2009, and has offices in London, Reykjavík, Stockholm and Warsaw.

Name and origins 
The company name is derived from a popular children's song, Eniga Meniga written by Icelandic playwright Ólafur Haukur Símonarson and performed by Icelandic author and musician Olga Guðrún Árnadóttir. The song is a playful ode to the song author's money problems.

Clients 
Meniga works with many banks in Europe, including Santander, Commerzbank, CSOB, Intesa Sanpaolo, ING, comdirect and mBank. In 2016, the company was working with more than 60 banks. In November 2017, Meniga partnered with Spanish banking concern IberCaja.

References 

Financial software companies
Software companies of Iceland
Icelandic brands